Visolit (previously TeleComputing) is a Norway-based international information technology operation, outsourcing and consultancy service company that provides services in Norway, Russia and Sweden, including IT on demand and software as a service services.

The company is based in Asker, Akershus, has 860 employees and provides services to 770 companies.

It has been listed on the Oslo Stock Exchange since 2000, and has grown partially due to its consolidation in the Norwegian and Swedish market.

In 2017, Sopra Steria buys the system development company Kentor. 

The company changed its name to Visolit in January 2019. The company was among the first in the world to offer ASP (Application Service Provider) services to companies. 

On August 10, 2021, Visolit was acquired by Advania.

References

External links
  (in Norwegian), the company's official website

Year of establishment missing
Business services companies of Norway
Companies based in Asker
Computer companies of Norway
Information technology consulting firms of Norway
Information technology companies of Norway
Outsourcing companies